The Conseil du patronat du Québec or CPQ is an institution that promotes business interests in Quebec, Canada.

It was established on January 20, 1969 and plays a significant role in the politics of Quebec by issuing opinions on the impact of the governments' decisions on the economy of Quebec.

Its positions often favour a corporate-friendly governance, fiscal conservatism, and constitutional stability or status quo; for example, it supported Bill 78.

Yves-Thomas Dorval is its current president.

Marc-André Roy is now the President of the Board of Administration.

Presidents of the CPQ

Presidents of the Board of Administration of the CPQ

Marcel Bundock (1986 - 1988)
Jeannine Guillevin Wood (1988 - 1990)
Guy Laflamme (1990 - 1994)
Jim Hewitt (1994 - 1996)
Ghislain Dufour (1996 - 1997)
André Y. Fortier (1998 - 2002)
Guy G. Dufresne (2002 - 2006)
John LeBoutillier (2006 - 2010)
Jean-Yves Leblanc (2010 - 2014)
Louis-Marie Beaulieu (2014 - 2017)
Marc-André Roy (2017 - )

References

Economy of Quebec
Organizations based in Montreal